Caenopedina annulata is a species of sea urchins of the Family Pedinidae. Their armour is covered with spines. Caenopedina annulata was first scientifically described in 1940 by Ole Theodor Jensen Mortensen.

References

Animals described in 1940
Pedinoida
Taxa named by Ole Theodor Jensen Mortensen